Greater Southern Area Health Service, abbreviated GSAHS, was formed in January 2005 from the amalgamation of the former Greater Murray Area Health Service and Southern Area Health Service. It is a statutory body of the Government of New South Wales, operating under the NSW Department of Health, charged with the provision of public health services in southern New South Wales. The head office of GSAHS is located in Queanbeyan.

Major facilities

Albury Base Hospital - Albury
Bateman's Bay District Hospital - Batemans Bay
Bega District Hospital - Bega
Cooma Hospital - Cooma
Cootamundra District Hospital - Cootamundra
Goulburn Base Hospital - Goulburn
Griffith Base Hospital - Griffith
Gundagai Hospital - Gundagai
Grenfell District Hospital - Grenfell, New South Wales
Hay Hospital - Hay
Leeton District Hospital - Leeton
Lockhart and District Hospital - Lockhart
Narrandera District Hospital - Narrandera
Queanbeyan Hospital - Queanbeyan
Wagga Wagga Base Hospital - Wagga Wagga
Yass District Hospital - Yass
Young District Hospital - Young

See also
List of hospitals in Australia

External links
Greater Southern Area Health Service website

Government agencies of New South Wales
Healthcare in Sydney